The 1907 College Baseball All-Southern Team consists of baseball players selected at their respective positions after the 1907 IAAUS baseball season.

All-Southerns

Key
H= John Heisman's selection.

References

All-Southern
College Baseball All-Southern Teams